Rafael Muñoz may refer to:

 Rafael Muñoz (swimmer) (born 1988), Spanish swimmer
 Rafael Muñoz (journalist) (1899–1972), Mexican journalist and writer
 Rafael Muñoz (musician) (died 1961), Puerto Rican big band director
 Rafael Muñoz Núñez (1925–2010), bishop of the Roman Catholic Diocese of Aguascalientes, Mexico
 Rafael Calderón Muñoz (1869–1943), Costa Rican politician
 Rafa Muñoz (born 1966), Spanish retired footballer and manager